Choloma is a city and municipality in the Honduran department of Cortés. It is the third-largest city in Honduras with a population of 202,000 (2020 calculation).
Many factories are stationed in Choloma due to its cheap labour which has boosted the municipality's economy. Choloma is just south of Puerto Cortes and north of San Pedro Sula, with transportation to other municipalities provided by private bus companies. Many transnational companies are stationed here for production as well as in various tax-free zones around the country.

Mayors

Sports
Atlético Choloma is the professional football club from Choloma, who have played in the Honduran national football league from 2011 through 2013. They play their home games at the Estadio Rubén Deras.

References

External links
Muni owes more than $1 million to private sand extraction company In Spanish.
Choloma crece al paso de la maquila

Municipalities of the Cortés Department